The Last Man Out is a British television drama series written, produced and directed by Shaun Sutton. The six-part black and white series was first aired on BBC One in 1962. All six episodes were later wiped, and are believed to be lost.

The signature tune was Lillibullero.

Cast
Graham Ashley
David Hargreaves
Barry Letts
Francis Matthews
Jack Melford
Anthony Sagar
Patrick Cargill
Michael Vernon
Peter Welch
Meadows White
Richard Hurndall
John Welsh

External links
 
 

1960s British drama television series
1962 British television series debuts
1962 British television series endings
BBC television dramas
Television shows set in Germany
Lost television shows
Black-and-white British television shows